Vinicius Kappke de Queiroz (born August 29, 1983) is a Brazilian mixed martial artist who most recently competed in the Heavyweight division of Bellator. A professional competitor since 2003, he has also competed for the UFC.

Background
Originally from Curitiba, Brazil, Queiroz began training when he was 13 years old. He is a national champion in wrestling, a black belt in Muay Thai and holds a 5-0 undefeated record in Muay Thai with all five wins coming by way of knockout. Quieroz is also a brown belt in Brazilian jiu-jitsu and has won titles in that sport as well.

Mixed martial arts career

Early career
Queiroz made his professional mixed martial arts debut in his native Brazil in November 2003. Over the next seven years, he amassed a record of 5 wins and 1 loss before signing with the UFC.

Ultimate Fighting Championship
Queiroz made his debut against Rob Broughton at UFC 120, losing via rear naked choke. Queiroz later tested positive for the steroid Stanozolol and was released by the UFC.

Bellator MMA
After sitting out from the sport for well over a year, Queiroz signed with Bellator in March 2012.

He made his debut as a participant in the Bellator Season Seven Heavyweight Tournament against Mark Holata at Bellator 75.  Despite being knocked down by a punch early on, Queiroz kept his composure and won the fight via armbar just a few minutes later.  He faced Alexander Volkov on November 9, 2012 at Bellator 80 in the semifinal. He lost via TKO in the second round in an extremely controversial fight.

Queiroz was scheduled to enter the Bellator Summer Series Heavyweight Tournament but pulled out due to an injury. He was replaced by Ryan Martinez.

In the fall of 2013, Queiroz entered the four-man Season Nine Heavyweight tournament.  He faced Lavar Johnson in the semifinals at Bellator 102 and won by a shocking knockout at just 23 seconds into the fight. He was scheduled to face Cheick Kongo in the finals but would withdraw due to a knee injury and was replaced by Peter Graham.

After nearly two years away from the sport, Queiroz returned to the Bellator cage to face  Ewerton Teixeira at Bellator 143 on September 25, 2015.  He won the fight via submission in the second round.

Mixed martial arts record

|-
| Loss
|align=center| 8–4
| Cheick Kongo
| Decision (split)
| Bellator 150
| 
| align=center| 3
| align=center| 5:00
| Mulvane, Kansas, United States
|
|-
| Win
|align=center| 8–3
| Ewerton Teixeira
| Submission (arm-triangle choke)
| Bellator 143
| 
| align=center| 2
| align=center| 4:00
| Hidalgo, Texas, United States
|
|-
| Win
|align=center| 7–3
| Lavar Johnson
| KO (punch)
| Bellator 102
| 
|align=center| 1
|align=center| 0:23
| Visalia, California, United States
| 
|-
| Loss
|align=center| 6–3
| Alexander Volkov
| TKO (punches)
| Bellator 80
| 
|align=center| 2
|align=center| 4:59
| Hollywood, Florida, United States
| Bellator Season Seven Heavyweight Tournament Semifinal.
|-
| Win
|align=center| 6–2
| Mark Holata
| Submission (armbar)
| Bellator 75
| 
|align=center| 1
|align=center| 3:26
| Hammond, Indiana, United States
| Bellator Season Seven Heavyweight Tournament Quarterfinal.
|-
| Loss
|align=center| 5–2
| Rob Broughton
| Submission (rear-naked choke)
| UFC 120
| 
|align=center| 3
|align=center| 1:43
| London, England, United Kingdom
|
|-
| Win
|align=center| 5–1
|  Danilo Rodaki
| TKO (knee and punches)
| Samurai Fight Combat 3
| 
|align=center| 1
|align=center| 2:46
| Curitiba, Paraná, Brazil
|
|-
| Win
|align=center| 4–1
|  Rogerio Farias
| KO (punches)
| Match Point Sports Aquafit Fight Championship 2
| 
|align=center| 1
|align=center| 0:46
| Porto Alegre, Brazil
|
|-
| Win
|align=center| 3–1
|  Nelson Martins
| KO (punch)
| Samurai Fight Combat 1
| 
|align=center| 1
|align=center| 1:58
| Curitiba, Paraná, Brazil
|
|-
| Win
|align=center| 2–1
|  Cleiton Moura
| KO (punches)
| Torneio Estimulo - Third Round
| 
|align=center| 1
|align=center| 0:35
| Curitiba, Paraná, Brazil
|
|-
| Loss
|align=center| 1–1
|  Danilo Pereira
| Decision (unanimous)
| Real Fight 4
| 
|align=center| 2
|align=center| 5:00
| São Paulo, Brazil
|
|-
| Win
|align=center| 1-0
|  Lamar Silva
| KO (head kick)
| Storm Samurai 1
| 
|align=center| 2
|align=center| 3:16
| Curitiba, Paraná, Brazil
|

References

External links
 
 
 

1983 births
Living people
Brazilian male mixed martial artists
Brazilian Muay Thai practitioners
Brazilian practitioners of Brazilian jiu-jitsu
Brazilian sportspeople in doping cases
Doping cases in mixed martial arts
Heavyweight mixed martial artists
Mixed martial artists utilizing Muay Thai
Mixed martial artists utilizing Brazilian jiu-jitsu
Ultimate Fighting Championship male fighters
Bellator male fighters